Kliff Timothy Kingsbury (born August 9, 1979) is an American football coach and former quarterback. He was previously a collegiate football coach from 2008 to 2018, where he achieved recognition for his development of quarterback prospects. During his collegiate career, Kingsbury served as the offensive quality control coach for two-time Sammy Baugh Trophy winner Case Keenum at Houston, the offensive coordinator for Heisman Trophy winner Johnny Manziel at Texas A&M, and the head coach for Sammy Baugh Trophy winner and future NFL MVP Patrick Mahomes at Texas Tech. Kingsbury was the head coach of the Arizona Cardinals from 2019 through the 2022 season.

Early life
Kingsbury was born in San Antonio, Texas, to Tim and Sally (née Moeller) Kingsbury.  Kingsbury played high school football at New Braunfels High School (Texas), where his father, Tim, was head coach. Kingsbury also was a member of the baseball, basketball, and track teams. As a quarterback at New Braunfels, Kingsbury threw for 3,009 yards and 34 touchdowns while leading the team to the Class 5A Division II semifinals and a 13–2 record. He was named the offensive MVP in the Texas High School Coaches All-Star Game. Kingsbury graduated 3rd in his class of 450, and was an Academic All-State selection. In May 2018, Kingsbury was formally inducted into the Texas High School Football Hall of Fame.

College career
In college, Kingsbury played quarterback for the Texas Tech Red Raiders for coach Spike Dykes from 1998–1999 and Mike Leach from 2000–2002. Kingsbury played 43 games at Texas Tech, completing 1,229 of 1,881 passes for 12,423 yards with 95 touchdowns and 40 interceptions overall during his career. After his college playing career, Kingsbury held 39 school records, 13 Big 12 Conference records, and 7 NCAA FBS records.

In his redshirt freshman year in 1999, Kingsbury appeared in six games, starting the season finale against Oklahoma. He completed 25 of 57 passes for 492 yards, four touchdowns and an interception in his initial collegiate season. In 2000, he assumed the starting role and connected on 362 of 585 passes for 3,418 yards, 21 touchdowns and 17 interceptions. He added two scores on 78 carries. His season ended with a loss to the East Carolina Pirates in the Gallery-Furniture.com Bowl, with a final score of 40–27.  As a junior in 2001, Kingsbury was an All-District first-team selection and All-Big 12 Conference second-team pick by the league's coaches for his performance. He completed 365 of 528 passes for 3,502 yards, 25 touchdowns and only nine interceptions.

In 2002, Kingsbury averaged 350.2 yards per game, setting a new record with 5017 yards and his 45 touchdown passes nearly doubled his mark set during the 2001 season. As a senior, Kingsbury led Texas Tech to a 9–5 record, defeating Big 12 Conference rivals Texas, Texas A&M and Baylor, in addition to a 55-15 routing of the Clemson Tigers in the Tangerine Bowl.

Following the 2002 season, he was awarded the Sammy Baugh Trophy, annually presented to the nation's best college passer. He was additionally selected as a Verizon/CoSIDA Academic All-American and Player of the Year, a unanimous All-Big 12 Conference first-team selection, was named the Associated Press Offensive Player of the Year, and finished 9th in Heisman Trophy voting. These awards followed a season during which he shattered his own school single-season records by completing 479 of 712 passes (67.3 percent) for 5,017 yards, 45 touchdowns and just 13 interceptions. He also added two rushing scores on 102 carries.

He, along with Graham Harrell, are the only Texas Tech quarterbacks to have beaten both the Oklahoma Sooners and Texas Longhorns during their careers as starters. Kingsbury led Tech to 3 bowl games in his 3 years as a starter, with a 24-16 overall record. In 2003, he held the NCAA records for career plays, career plays per game, single season and career passing attempts, single season and career passing completions, highest single game completion percentage, career lowest percentage of passes intercepted, and most single season and career games gaining 200 yards or more.

Kingsbury was only the third player in college football history to throw for over 10,000 yards, gain over 10,000 yards in total offense and complete over 1,000 passes in a career. He also became just the fourth player in college football to throw for over 3,000 yards three times during his career.  Kingsbury was also an Academic All-Big 12 Conference choice following his sophomore campaign in 2000.

College statistics

Professional career

Kingsbury was selected by the New England Patriots with the 201st overall selection (6th round) of the 2003 NFL Draft. He did not play in his rookie season of 2003, spending the year on the Patriots' injured reserve with an arm injury. He did, however, get a Super Bowl ring. He was waived by the Patriots on September 6, 2004.

He was signed by the New Orleans Saints to the team's practice squad, where he spent the entire 2004 season. He went to training camp with the Saints that season and completed 10-of-21 passes for 139 yards with a long of 57 yards and two interceptions.

He was signed to the Denver Broncos' practice squad on September 6, 2005, and was released on September 21, 2005.

He then signed with the New York Jets on September 28, 2005. Kingsbury made his NFL debut on November 20, 2005, playing part of the fourth quarter for the Jets against the Denver Broncos. He completed one of two pass attempts for 17 yards.

The Buffalo Bills signed Kingsbury in 2006 and he attended training camp with the Bills but he was cut before the regular season.

NFL Europe
The New York Jets assigned Kingsbury to the Cologne Centurions of NFL Europe in 2006. He posted the top quarterback rating of any Cologne quarterback (73.7) while completing 58 of 102 passes for 633 yards and two touchdowns. He also led Cologne with a 56.9 completion percentage.

Canadian Football League
On March 30, 2007, Kingsbury signed with the Montréal Alouettes. He spent part of training camp in Montréal before being traded to the Winnipeg Blue Bombers on June 20 in exchange for quarterback Brad Banks. He was the third-string quarterback for the 2007 Blue Bombers season behind Kevin Glenn and Ryan Dinwiddie.

Coaching career

Houston
In August 2008, Kingsbury joined the University of Houston football staff in the position of quality control.
Kingsbury was drawn to Houston through his ties with Dana Holgorsen who had been the offensive coordinator at Texas Tech prior to Houston. Kingsbury received recognition for the performance of the Houston offense in 2009 with Case Keenum at the helm. Keenum finished his Houston career with multiple NCAA Division I passing records. With Holgorsen departing to become the offensive coordinator at Oklahoma State University, Kingsbury was promoted to the position of co-offensive coordinator and quarterbacks coach for the Cougars serving alongside former UH receiver Jason Phillips. Kingsbury quickly gained Coach Kevin Sumlin's trust and began calling all the offensive plays and was recognized as the 2011 Offensive Coordinator of the year after Houston led college football, averaging 50 points and nearly 600 yards of offense per game.

Texas A&M
After a record-breaking 2011 season in which Houston led the NCAA in yards, points, and virtually every offensive category, Kingsbury joined former Houston head coach Kevin Sumlin to be the offensive coordinator for Texas A&M for the 2012 season, coaching Heisman Trophy-winning quarterback Johnny Manziel. The Aggies led the Southeastern Conference in rushing, passing, total and scoring offense, and were the nation's only offense ranked in the top 15 of the NCAA statistics in all four categories. For his performance, Kingsbury was named the 2012 Footballscoop.com Offensive Coordinator of the Year and was named a finalist for the Broyles Award.

Texas Tech

Kingsbury returned to his alma mater as Texas Tech's 15th full-time head coach on December 12, 2012, following the abrupt departure of coach Tommy Tuberville to Cincinnati preceding the 2012 Meineke Car Care Bowl of Texas. Texas Tech athletic director Kirby Hocutt announced the hire with a video linked from his Twitter account. The video panned over to Kingsbury, who flashed the Guns Up sign and said, "Wreck 'em, Tech." Kingsbury's contract included a base salary of $10.5 million over 5 years, and creative control over the team's uniforms.

At 33, Kingsbury was the second-youngest head coach of a team in an AQ conference, and the third-youngest head coach in college football. Only Matt Campbell of Toledo and P. J. Fleck of Western Michigan were younger.

2013 season
Kingsbury made his head coaching debut August 30, 2013 with a 41–23 victory over the SMU Mustangs. Kingsbury chose walk-on true freshman quarterback Baker Mayfield for the starting role at the position, and Mayfield was named Big 12 Offensive Player of the Week for his performance. Mayfield is believed to be the first walk-on true freshman to start a season opener for a BCS school.

Mayfield was later supplanted by Davis Webb, another true freshman quarterback, due to a knee injury during the Kansas game. Following Webb's first start against Iowa State, Webb was also named Big 12 Offensive Player of the Week. Texas Tech became the only school in the Big 12 Conference to have had three different freshman quarterbacks win the award, with the first being Kingsbury himself in 1999.

The Red Raiders made their Associated Press Top 25 debut in the Kingsbury era following a win over TCU on September 12, 2013. It was the earliest a first year coach at Texas Tech achieved a spot in the rankings. Kingsbury also became the first coach in Texas Tech history to start the season 6–0 in their debut season after the Red Raiders defeated Iowa State on October 12, 2013. Following a victory against West Virginia on October 19, 2013, Kingsbury led the Red Raiders to a 7–0 start for only the fourth time in program history. The 10th-place ranking the team received in the BCS also marked the highest the program had been ranked since the 2008 season. With the win over West Virginia, Kingsbury became the first Big 12 coach to start his career 7–0. The Texas Tech Red Raiders finished Kliff Kingsbury's first year at Texas Tech by losing the last 5 games of the season, finishing the rookie coach's first regular season at 7–5. Tight end Jace Amaro was also named as a Consensus All-American, the first Red Raider to be selected as such since Michael Crabtree in 2008.

Kingsbury and the Red Raiders capped off the season with a 37–23 upset over the #14 ranked Arizona State in the 2013 Holiday Bowl following an impressive performance by quarterback Davis Webb. Two of Kingsbury's players would be selected in the 2014 NFL Draft, Amaro and Will Smith. Following the season, Baker Mayfield transferred to Oklahoma. He eventually won the 2017 Heisman trophy and was selected 1st overall in the 2018 NFL Draft.

2014 season
On August 29, 2014, Kingsbury received a $1 million raise to $3.5 million and a contract extension through 2020. The extension specified that Kingsbury's salary would increase by $200,000 a year to a maximum of $5.5 million in 2020. The extension was given following an announcement for a $185 million athletic fundraising campaign. Under Kingsbury's leadership Texas Tech sold out 2014 season tickets for the first time since Texas Tech's inaugural 1925 season. The 2014 team struggled with numerous injuries, finishing 4–8 on the season.

2015 season
The Red Raiders made numerous changes heading into the 2015 season. Kingsbury added defensive coordinator David Gibbs hoping to bolster a defense that ranked amongst the worst in the country. The Red Raiders rebounded with a strong season as running back DeAndré Washington finished with 1,492 yards and 16 touchdowns and Patrick Mahomes finished with 4,653 yards and 36 passing touchdowns. Although the offense rebounded quite nicely and finished the season in the top 3 nationally, the defense finished 2nd to last only better than Kansas. Kingsbury finished his 3rd season with signature wins at Arkansas and at Texas showing promise heading into 2016. The 2015 season concluded at 7–6, 4–5 in Big 12 play good for a 5th-place finish. Tech lost in the Texas Bowl to LSU. Three of Kingsbury's players were selected in the 2016 NFL Draft, Le'Raven Clark, DeAndré Washington, and Jakeem Grant.

2016 season
The Red Raiders finished 5–7, 3–6 in Big 12 play. The team disappointed with conference wins against Kansas, TCU, and Baylor and finished in 8th place in the Big 12. The Red Raiders finished the 2016 season with a 55–34 victory over Baylor. This victory snapped a 5-game losing streak against the Bears that went back to Kingsbury's days in Lubbock, before he was the Red Raider's head coach. The 2016 team finished with the 6th best offense and the worst defense in Division I FBS. Patrick Mahomes was the lone Red Raider drafted after a disappointing campaign going in the first round #10 overall to the Kansas City Chiefs.

2017 season
The Red Raiders entered a make or break season in 2017 for Kingsbury. The team responded positively finishing the 2017 season improved from the prior season finishing 6–7, 3–6 in Big 12 play. The team showed signs of improvement as the offense finishing #16 in the country overcoming the loss of first round pick Patrick Mahomes. The defense also showed signs of improvement jumping up to joint #58 overall, a vast improvement for a defense that was the worst in the NCAA the prior season. At the conclusion of the season Athletic Director Kirby Hocutt confirmed that Kingsbury would be returning for his 6th season as the Red Raiders coach.

2018 season
The 2018 season started quickly with the Red Raiders defeating Houston and Oklahoma State on their way to a 5–2 record. Texas Tech then dropped its final five games of the season to finish at 5–7. Three straight losing seasons overall and six straight losing seasons in the Big 12 ultimately sealed the fate for Kingsbury. Athletic director Kirby Hocutt announced on November 25 that Kingsbury would not be retained for the 2019 season. He left with an overall record of 35–40 (including 13 victories over lower tier Group of Five and FCS competition) and 19–35 in Big 12 play.

USC Trojans
Kingsbury was hired by USC as their new offensive coordinator in December 2018. In January 2019, reports surfaced that Kingsbury was a candidate to interview for the New York Jets and Arizona Cardinals head coaching jobs. USC athletic director Lynn Swann blocked requests from NFL teams to interview Kingsbury because he already signed the contractual agreement. One month into being USC's offensive coordinator, Kingsbury resigned from the position, leading to decommittments from his recruits. Kingsbury would be subsequently replaced by fellow Texas Tech Red Raiders QB, Graham Harrell.

Arizona Cardinals

After interviewing with the New York Jets, Kingsbury flew to Arizona and met with the Arizona Cardinals. On January 8, 2019, Kingsbury took the job as the head coach of the Arizona Cardinals. Some attributed Kingsbury's hiring to the "Sean McVay Effect."

2019 season

Kingsbury won his first preseason game 17–13 against the Los Angeles Chargers on August 8, 2019. However, the Cardinals started the season 0–3–1. On October 6, 2019, Kingsbury won his first regular-season game against the Cincinnati Bengals by a score of 26–23. Despite a 3–3–1 start, Kingsbury led the Cardinals to a record of 2–7 down the stretch, finishing the season 5–10–1 and 4th in the NFC West.

2020 season

On September 13, 2020, Kingsbury led the Cardinals to win their first game of the 2020 NFL season by defeating the defending NFC champions San Francisco 49ers by a score of 24–20, marking Kingsbury's first win of the season. It marked the first time the Cardinals won a Week 1 game since 2015. It also marked Kingsbury's 6th win of his NFL head coaching career. In Week 7, Kingsbury's Cardinals defeated the undefeated Seattle Seahawks by a score of 37–34 in overtime to improve to 5–2 on the season. Although they lost their next game to the Miami Dolphins following a Week 8 bye, they rebounded with the Hail Murray win over the Buffalo Bills to improve to 6–3 on the season. Ultimately, Kingsbury and the Cardinals would suffer a late-season collapse as they would go 2–5 over their final seven games and finish with an 8–8 record, good for 3rd in the NFC West, but not good enough for a playoff berth as they lost out on the NFC's final playoff spot due to losing a tiebreaker to the Chicago Bears.

2021 season

On September 12, 2021, Kingsbury led the Cardinals to win their first away game of the 2021 NFL season by defeating the Tennessee Titans by a score of 38–13. The following game on September 19 was a win at home against the Minnesota Vikings in which a missed late-game field goal attempt by the Vikings ensured a Cardinal's victory with a score of 34–33. This marks the seventh time in Arizona Cardinals history that the team has started a season 3–0 and only the fourth time that a coach has led the team to consecutive 2–0 starts. On October 15, 2021, it was revealed that Kingsbury and several others on the Cardinals coaching staff tested positive for COVID-19, thus rendering them ineligible to coach the Week 6 matchup against the Cleveland Browns. Defensive coordinator Vance Joseph and special teams coordinator Jeff Rodgers assumed head coaching duties for the game and led the Cardinals to a 37–14 win. After starting the season 10–2 and 1st in the NFC West, Kingsbury and the Cardinals would suffer another late-season collapse as the team ultimately finished 2nd in the NFC West with an 11–6 regular season record. In his playoff debut, Kingsbury and the Cardinals lost 34–11 in the first round of the playoffs to the Los Angeles Rams.

2022 season

On March 2, 2022, Kingsbury signed a six-year extension through 2027. After an offseason with great expectations, Kingsbury led the Cardinals to a record of 4–13, their worst record since Kingsbury arrived in Arizona. Kingsbury was fired on January 9, 2023. He finished his tenure with the Cardinals with a 28–37–1 record with only one playoff appearance.

Personal life
Kingsbury was born in San Antonio, Texas. His father, Tim Kingsbury, is a Vietnam War veteran and Purple Heart recipient. Kingsbury's mother Sally died in 2005 of soft tissue sarcoma. He graduated from New Braunfels High School, home of the Mighty Unicorns, where he was starting quarterback. 
 Kingsbury graduated from Texas Tech University in 2001 with a Bachelor of Business Administration degree in Management from the Rawls College of Business.

Head coaching record

College

NFL

See also
 List of NCAA Division I FBS career passing touchdowns leaders
 List of NCAA Division I FBS career passing yards leaders
 List of NCAA major college football yearly passing leaders
 List of NCAA major college football yearly total offense leaders

References

External links
 Arizona Cardinals bio
 Texas Tech Red Raiders bio
 

1979 births
Living people
American football quarterbacks
American players of Canadian football
American expatriate sportspeople in Canada
American expatriate sportspeople in Germany
Arizona Cardinals head coaches
Canadian football quarterbacks
Cologne Centurions (NFL Europe) players
Houston Cougars football coaches
New Braunfels High School alumni
New England Patriots players
New Orleans Saints players
New York Jets players
Players of American football from San Antonio
Players of Canadian football from San Antonio
Rawls College of Business alumni
Sportspeople from San Antonio
Sportspeople from New Braunfels, Texas
People from New Braunfels, Texas
Texas A&M Aggies football coaches
Texas Tech Red Raiders football coaches
Texas Tech Red Raiders football players
Winnipeg Blue Bombers players
National Football League offensive coordinators